The governor of San Luis is a citizen of San Luis Province, in Argentina, holding the office of governor for the corresponding period. The governor is elected alongside a vice-governor. Currently the governor of San Luis is Alberto Rodríguez Saá.

Governors since 1983

See also
 Legislature of San Luis
 Senate of San Luis
 Chamber of Deputies of San Luis

References

San Luis
San Luis Province